was a  in service with the Imperial Japanese Navy during World War II. She was the only member of her class to survive the war, and did so without suffering any major damage. Following the war, the ship was transferred to the Republic of China Navy, where she was renamed Dan Yang ( DD-12) and served until 1966, before being scrapped in 1970.

Design and description
The Kagerō class was an enlarged and improved version of the preceding  of destroyers. Their crew numbered 240 officers and enlisted men. The ships had two Kampon geared steam turbines, each driving one propeller shaft, using steam provided by three Kampon water-tube boilers.

The main armament of the Kagerō class consisted of six Type 3  guns in three twin-gun turrets, one superfiring pair aft and one turret forward of the superstructure. They were built with four Type 96  anti-aircraft guns in two twin-gun mounts, but more of these guns were added over the course of the war. The ships were also armed with eight  torpedo tubes for the oxygen-fueled Type 93 "Long Lance" torpedo in two quadruple traversing mounts; one reload was carried for each tube. Their anti-submarine weapons consisted of 16 depth charges.

Construction and career

Imperial Japanese Navy
During the Pacific War, the attrition rate of Japanese destroyers was extremely high due to heavy, prolonged combat and the need to use them to transport supplies to scattered Japanese island garrisons. Early in the war, Yukikaze took part in the invasions of the Philippines and the Dutch East Indies. She participated in the battles of Midway, Santa Cruz, Leyte Gulf, and the Philippine Sea, as well as a lengthy stint on Guadalcanal troop runs and the naval battles around that island. Yukikaze also survived Operation Ten-Go, during which the battleship  was sunk. Between these major engagements, Yukikaze participated in escort duty for ships in transit, particularly in the redeployment of the aircraft carrier  during which the newly completed carrier was torpedoed by a U.S. Navy submarine and sunk. She spent the last months of the war on security duty in Japanese harbors and survived many Allied air raids.

Yukikaze took part in more than 10 major battles, and more than 100 escort missions and resupply transport missions during World War II.

After the war, she was used as a transport to bring home Japanese military forces still abroad.

ROCS Dan Yang
On 6 July 1947, Yukikaze was transferred to the Republic of China as a war reparation, where she was renamed Dan Yang ( DD-12). All destroyers were named after Yang regardless of country of origin.

Dan Yang served as flagship of the Republic of China Navy. It was an unarmed training vessel until 1952. In 1953, it was fitted with Type 89 12.7 cm/40 dual mounted guns, in addition to the Type 98 10cm/65 dual mounted guns already in use. In 1956, Dan Yang had all the Japanese armaments removed and replaced with three open air mounted 5"/38 caliber guns, 3"/50 caliber guns replaced the torpedo tubes, Bofors 40 mm guns, and newer depth charge launchers. The Republic of China Navy had no use for the original torpedo tubes as they did not have access to the appropriate armaments.

She is notable for visiting Manila where 50,000 overseas Chinese visited her in August 1953. Dan Yangs service included patrolling the South China Sea and intercepting incoming ships carrying wartime materials into Shanghai. On 4 October 1953, she captured the Polish civilian oil tanker Praca at 21°06'N 122°48'E in the West Pacific Ocean, 125 sea miles southeast of Taiwan. She also saw action along the Taiwan Strait in a supporting role as it was one of the few ships with long range guns. However, the arrival of surplus US destroyers entering service put the famous destroyer that once served as flagship into retirement, and she was scrapped in 1970 after being damaged beyond repair in a typhoon in 1969.

In Japan, there was a campaign to have her returned to Japan from Taiwan for preservation as a museum ship since she was the symbol for longevity. Her rudder and one of her anchors were repatriated to the Japan Navy Academy museum as a good will gesture.

Notes

References

External links
Tabular record of movement from combinedfleet.com

Kagerō-class destroyers
Ships built by Sasebo Naval Arsenal
1939 ships
World War II destroyers of Japan
Destroyers of the Republic of China Navy